Go Too (1977) is Go's third album. Go was founded by Stomu Yamashta, Steve Winwood and Michael Shrieve. For this album, Jess Roden replaced Steve Winwood (who had left the group). The style of the music became modified accordingly. In addition, Linda Lewis was hired as a singer. Together with Paul Jackson, Jr. and the orchestra of Martyn Ford the  album unified various soundscapes.

The album begins with the song Prelude, a synthesizer tune that is marked by Klaus Schulze's play. This is followed by Seen You Before, a jazz-funk-fusion piece of music with a remarkable solo by Al Di Meola.

The next piece, Madness is a funk tune that crossfades at the end with the sound of waves onto the romantic song Mystery of Love.  The tune is dominated by Al Di Meolas moving guitar solos and the emotional vocals of Roden and Lewis.

Wheels of Fortune is characterized by complex rhythms and almost pure jazz, while Beauty again strikes a romantic note. The album ends with a funk-pointed piece, You and Me and Ecliptic,  reminiscent of a synthesizer tune of whale songs.

Personnel 
Stomu Yamashta - synthesizers, piano, tympani, percussion
Klaus Schulze - synthesizers
J. Peter Robinson - keyboards
Al Di Meola - lead guitar
Doni Harvey - guitar, vocals
Jess Roden - lead vocals
Linda Lewis - lead vocals
Paul Jackson - bass
Michael Shrieve - drums
Brother James - percussion
The Martin Ford Orchestra
Paul Buckmaster - Orchestral Arrangements

Track listing
"Prélude" - 3:10
"Seen You Before" - 6:18
"Madness" - 6:27
"Mysteries of Love" - 6:15
"Wheels of Fortune" - 5:37
"Beauty" - 5:11
"You and Me" - 6:59
"Ecliptic" - 2:33

Chart performance

References

External links 
 

Go (band) albums
Klaus Schulze albums
1977 albums
Albums arranged by Paul Buckmaster
Arista Records albums